Alvin Light Fisher (January 5, 1893 – March 1, 1937) was a Canadian ice hockey right winger. He played in the Western Canada, Pacific Coast and National hockey leagues for the Calgary Tigers, Seattle Metropolitans and Toronto St. Pats, respectively. He was born in Sault Ste. Marie, Ontario. Prior to his hockey career, he had served in the Canadian Forces during World War I, where he was wounded.

Alvin Fisher died suddenly at Ranger Lake in 1937 at the age of 44. He suffered from poor health in the preceding years including heart problems, with the cause of death on his death certificate listed as acute pericarditis. He was buried at Old Greenwood Cemetery in Sault Ste. Marie.

Career statistics

Regular season and playoffs

References

External links

1893 births
1937 deaths
Calgary Tigers players
Canadian ice hockey right wingers
Canadian military personnel of World War I
Ice hockey people from Ontario
Ontario Hockey Association Senior A League (1890–1979) players
Seattle Metropolitans players
Sportspeople from Sault Ste. Marie, Ontario
Toronto St. Pats players